The icon of Saints John the Baptist and Minias is an early-Quattrocento (1400–1450) wood panel with tempera painting by the Florentine painter Bicci di Lorenzo (137–1452).

Work
Saint Minias of Florence is also known as San Miniato. The painting is tempera and gold sheet on poplar. It currently resides in the Legion of Honor Museum in San Francisco, California, which also has a similar peaked wood panel by Bicci, depicting Saints Anthony and Stephen. These are almost certainly panels from a larger altarpiece.

References

Italian paintings
Gothic paintings
15th-century paintings
Paintings in the collection of the Fine Arts Museums of San Francisco
Paintings depicting John the Baptist